Hrvatski rukometni klub Katarina Mostar is a women's handball team from the city of Mostar, Bosnia and Herzegovina.

The club plays in the Handball Championship of Bosnia and Herzegovina. The clubs greatest success are two Handball Cup of Bosnia and Herzegovina titles.

Honours
Handball Cup of Bosnia and Herzegovina:
Winners (2): 2007, 2011

European record

Recent seasons
The recent season-by-season performance of the club:

Notable players
  Ćamila Mičijević

Coaching history

 Sanja Bajgorić

References

External links
 EHF Club profile

Bosnia and Herzegovina handball clubs
Sport in Mostar
Handball clubs established in 1992
1992 establishments in Bosnia and Herzegovina
Croatian sports clubs outside Croatia